Justine Pelletier (born 27 February 2001) is a Canadian rugby union player.

Pelletier competed for Canada at the delayed 2021 Rugby World Cup in New Zealand. She was in the starting line-up in all three matches of the knockout stage against the United States, England, and France.

References

External links 

 Justine Pelletier at Canada Rugby

Living people
2001 births
Female rugby union players
Canadian female rugby union players
Canada women's international rugby union players